Ilanga lase Natal (The Natal Sun or Sun of Natal) is a Zulu language newspaper, published in KwaZulu-Natal. It was the first ever newspaper to be published in the language. It was co-founded in 1903 by John Langalibalele Dube. Among its contributors was Magema Magwaza Fuze. It is owned by the investment arm of the Inkatha Freedom Party.

External links 
 https://ilanganews.co.za

References 

Zulu-language mass media
Newspapers published in South Africa
Publications established in 1903
Mass media in KwaZulu-Natal